The Holhol or El-Hajj Hassan Gouled is a basic military training centre for the Djibouti Armed Forces and is located in Holhol south of the country. El-Hajj Hassan Gouled Military Training Center is one of the biggest basic infantry centers in Djibouti. A major focus of the development of the Djibouti Armed Forces is on raising the levels of training among the troops.

Military training
All cadets are commissioned as second lieutenants in the Djiboutian National Army in one of its branch schools. Currently the emphasis is on training the DJNA instructors so that they will be able to continue training other recruits in the future. It is in the middle of the Sub-Saharan desert with temperatures reaching 47 degrees Celsius during summer.

The current list of schools is Armor, Artillery, Human Resources, Signal, Infantry, Legal, Military Police, and Intelligence.

Military of Djibouti
Army training installations
Ali Sabieh Region
Schools in Djibouti